Blue Grass Airport  is a public airport in Fayette County, Kentucky, United States, 6 miles west of downtown Lexington. Located among horse farms and situated directly across from Keeneland Race Course, Blue Grass Airport is the primary airport serving central and eastern Kentucky. More than 1.3 million passengers depart or arrive annually at Blue Grass Airport. In 2017, the airport served 1,316,847 passengers via four major airline carriers: Allegiant Air, American Airlines, Delta Air Lines, and United Airlines.

Features and facilities
On August 4, 2010, a new 4,000 foot runway, 9/27, opened replacing the previous 3,500 foot runway, 8/26. The previous runway, which is in a similar location as the new runway except that it overlapped runway 22, was removed after a 2006 crash of a Delta Connection flight, during which all aboard except the co-pilot were killed after an attempted take-off from the wrong, shorter runway. Blue Grass Airport is home to the Aviation Museum of Kentucky, which features more than 25,000 square feet of exhibit space displaying restored aircraft and memorabilia. The current main terminal building opened in 1977. On April 18, 2007, Blue Grass Airport opened an extension of Concourse B, adding six boarding gates with four new jet bridges.

Economic impact
Blue Grass Airport is a catalyst for economic growth in the region, contributing to both the Lexington area and other parts of Kentucky. The airport is an important component of Lexington's economy, providing 3,478 jobs for Lexington and an annual economic impact of $370 million. In addition to commercial passenger service, the airport also offers corporate and general aviation services, including a newly constructed general aviation terminal, U.S. Customs, charter flights, aircraft maintenance, hangars, and flight instruction.

Passenger numbers
The airport is the third busiest airport in Kentucky, behind Cincinnati/Northern Kentucky International Airport (9.1 million passengers/year) and Louisville International Airport (4.2 million passengers/year).

Airlines and destinations

Passenger

Destinations map

Statistics

Top destinations

Airline market share

History

Blue Grass Airport began as a municipal airfield that was developed with the assistance of the Federal Civil Works Administration as part of a state-wide airport development policy in 1933. The town share for construction was $1,362 with a portion of $22,427 spent in Lexington overall.
Blue Grass Airport opened with a star-shaped layout. In World War II it was used by pilots training at Bowman for dead-stick landing practice in preparation for glider assaults.

The original airport logo was designed by a student who attended and graduated from the University of Kentucky.  Dr. Jill Reiling Markey (class of 1978) designed the logo in 1976.  The current logo is based on Dr. Markey's design. For her efforts, Dr. Markey was awarded the Commission of Kentucky Colonel by then Governor Julian M. Carroll in 1976.

Accidents and incidents
November 14, 1970: An Aero Commander 1121 Jet Commander operated by Royal Crown Cola Corp. impacted terrain at a steep angle during a missed approach procedure possibly caused by spatial disorientation, low ceiling and rain. Both occupants were killed.
December 5, 1987: After suffering an in-flight engine fire en route from Dallas, Texas to New York, the flight crew of a Hawker Siddeley HS.125 business jet, registration number N400PH, touched down short of the runway while attempting an emergency landing. The jet crossed a highway and struck an automobile, utility poles and two fences, killing the pilot and copilot and injuring both passengers in the aircraft and two people in the automobile. The accident was attributed to the crew's inadvertent retraction of the aircraft's flaps, causing the jet to suddenly lose altitude.
November 1993: The flight crew of a commercial jet was cleared for takeoff on Runway 22 but mistakenly entered the shorter Runway 26 instead. Tower personnel noticed the mistake and canceled the aircraft's takeoff clearance just as the crew realized their error. The aircraft subsequently made a safe departure from Runway 22.
August 30, 2002: A Learjet 35C, registration number N45CP, overran Runway 4 on landing, killing one passenger and seriously injuring four other occupants of the aircraft. The accident was attributed to the pilot's application of additional forward thrust after failing to properly deploy the jet's thrust reversers.
August 27, 2006: Comair Flight 5191, a Bombardier CRJ-100ER operated by regional carrier Comair on behalf of Delta Connection, overran Runway 26 and crashed after being cleared for takeoff from the much longer Runway 22. There were 49 fatalities and first officer James Polehinke was the only survivor.
March 25, 2009: A Cessna 182, registration number N4871N, crashed 3 mi (5 km) west of the airport, killing the pilot, who was flying alone. The pilot apparently became disoriented during the landing approach after losing electrical power in densely clouded IFR conditions, but the cause of the crash was not positively determined.
March 24, 2010: A medical helicopter, Eurocopter EC135, made an emergency landing with a patient on board, skidding to a stop along a grassy area next to a runway after an engine had lost power. There were no reports of injuries, but emergency vehicles flooded the area moments after the helicopter landed.
March 9, 2011: NASCAR driver Greg Biffle and two others were unhurt after the landing gear of their Falcon 20 collapsed as the plane landed, causing the plane to skid to a stop on the runway. The plane was en route to Lexington from Statesville, North Carolina.
The evening after Biffle's accident, around 7:00 p.m., an Atlantic Southeast Airlines Bombardier regional jet flying for Delta Connection made an emergency landing in Lexington. The plane carried 38 people, including the entire football coaching staff from Marshall University. The jet was supposed to land in Charleston, West Virginia but diverted because of landing-gear troubles. The Marshall coaches were reportedly on their way back from trips to Mississippi State University and Texas Christian University.
December 21, 2011: An AirTran Boeing 717 carrying 106 passengers experienced engine trouble on its way from O'Hare International Airport to Hartsfield–Jackson Atlanta International Airport and safely landed at Blue Grass Airport just after 4 p.m. An AirTran spokesperson said that the captain shut the engine down during flight and diverted to Lexington. Crews replaced that engine overnight. There were no reported injuries.
May 19, 2018: An Endeavor Air Bombardier CRJ-900 operating as Delta Connection Flight 3359 from Hartsfield-Jackson Atlanta International Airport skidded off the runway after an inch of rain had fallen in an hour. No one was injured.

Popular culture
Bluegrass Field was Auric Goldfinger's flight destination in the James Bond film Goldfinger.

See also
 Kentucky World War II Army Airfields

References

External links

Blue Grass Airport (official website)

Airports in Kentucky
Airfields of the United States Army Air Forces in Kentucky
Buildings and structures in Fayette County, Kentucky
Airports established in 1942
1942 establishments in Kentucky
Transportation in Lexington, Kentucky